Elections to the Legislative Assembly of the Indian state of Mysore were held on 26 March 1952. 394 candidates contested for 99 seats in 80 constituencies in the Assembly. There were 19 two-member constituencies and 61 single-member constituencies, accounting for 99 seats.

Results

!colspan=8|
|- style="background-color:#E9E9E9; text-align:center;"
! class="unsortable" |
! Political party !! Flag !! Seats  Contested !! Won !! % of  Seats !! Votes !! Vote %
|- style="background: #90EE90;"
| 
| 
| 99 || 74 || 74.75 || 12,76,318 || 46.35
|-
| 
|
| 59 || 8 || 8.08 || 3,91,653 || 14.22
|-
| 
|
| 47 || 3 || 3.03 || 240390 || 8.73
|-
|
| 
| 7 || 2 || 2.02 || 47,916 || 1.74
|-
| 
| 
| 5 || 1 || 1.01 || 25,116 || 0.91
|-
| 
|
| 154 || 11 || 11.11 || 7,10,359 || 25.79
|- class="unsortable" style="background-color:#E9E9E9"
! colspan = 3| Total seats
! 99 !! style="text-align:center;" |Voters !! 54,66,487 !! style="text-align:center;" |Turnout !! 27,53,870 (50.38%)
|}

List of Successful Candidates

State reorganization
On 1 November 1956, Mysore state was enlarged by the addition of Coorg State, the Kollegal taluk of the Coimbatore district and the South Kanara district (except the Kasaragod taluk) of Madras State,  the districts of Raichur and Gulbarga from western Hyderabad State and the Kannada speaking districts of Dharwar, Bijapur, North Kanara, and Belgaum, (except the Chandgad taluk of Belgaum district) from southern Bombay State under States Reorganisation Act, 1956. The Siruguppa taluk, the Bellary taluk, the Hospet taluk, and a small area of the Mallapuram sub-taluk were detached from the Mysore State. This resulted in an increase in assembly constituencies from 80 with 99 seats to 179 with 208 seats in 1957 assembly elections.

See also

 Mysore State
 1951–52 elections in India
 1957 Mysore Legislative Assembly election

References

State Assembly elections in Karnataka
Mysore
March 1952 events in Asia
Government of Mysore